Agent Communication Language (ACL), proposed by the Foundation for Intelligent Physical Agents (FIPA), is a proposed standard language for agent communications.  Knowledge Query and Manipulation Language (KQML) is another proposed standard.

The most popular ACLs are:

 FIPA-ACL (by the Foundation for Intelligent Physical Agents, a standardization consortium)
 KQML (Knowledge Query and Manipulation Language)

Both rely on speech act theory developed by Searle in the 1960s and enhanced by Winograd and Flores in the 1970s. They define a set of performatives, also called Communicative Acts, and their meaning (e.g. ask-one). The content of the performative is not standardized, but varies from system to system.

To make agents understand each other they have to not only speak the same language, but also have a common ontology. An ontology is a part of the agent's knowledge base that describes what kind of things an agent can deal with and how they are related to each other.

Examples of frameworks that implement a standard agent communication language (FIPA-ACL) include FIPA-OS
and Jade.

References

Formal languages
Knowledge representation
Agent communications languages